Mendes Pinto is a crater on Mercury. It has a diameter of 214 kilometers. Its name was adopted by the International Astronomical Union (IAU) in 1976. Mendes Pinto is named for the Portuguese adventurer Fernão Mendes Pinto, who lived from 1510 to 1583.

References

Impact craters on Mercury